Eddy Seigneur (born 15 February 1969 in Beauvais) is a French former professional road racing cyclist. His sporting career began with VC Beauvais Oise. He won the Champs-Élysées stage in 1994 Tour de France. He is a four-time French national time trial champion and he also won the French road race championship in 1995.

Major results

1990
 1st Grand Prix de la ville de Nogent-sur-Oise
1993
 1st Grand Prix de Rennes
 2nd Grand Prix d'Isbergues
 2nd Grand Prix d'Ouverture La Marseillaise
 3rd Overall Four Days of Dunkirk
1st Stage 2b (ITT)
 3rd Grand Prix des Nations
 3rd Chrono des Nations 
1994
 1st  Overall Four Days of Dunkirk
1st Stage 2b (ITT)
 1st Stage 21 Tour de France
 1st Chateau–Chinon
 1st Dun Le Palestel
1995
 1st  National Road Race Championships
 1st Stage 1 Circuit Cycliste Sarthe
 1st Dijon (Criterium)
1996
Aubervilliers
 1st  National Time Trial Championships
 1st Overall Tour du Poitou-Charentes
1st Stage 5 (ITT)
1997
 1st  Overall Circuit des Mines
1st Stage 3 (ITT)
 2nd Duo Normand (with Andrea Peron)
 4th Grand Prix des Nations
2000
 2nd National Time Trial Championships
2001
 1st Stage 7 Circuit des Mines (ITT)
 2nd Classic Haribo
 3rd National Time Trial Championships
2002
 1st  National Time Trial Championships
2003
 1st  National Time Trial Championships
 Volta ao Alentejo
1st Stages 1 & 5 (ITT)
2004
 1st  National Time Trial Championships
 1st Duo Normand (with Frédéric Finot)
 5th Grand Prix des Nations

External links

Official Tour de France results for Eddy Seigneur

References 

1969 births
Living people
French male cyclists
French Tour de France stage winners
Tour de France Champs Elysées stage winners
Sportspeople from Beauvais
Cyclists from Hauts-de-France